Analytics is the systematic computational analysis of data or statistics. It is used for the discovery, interpretation, and communication of meaningful patterns in data. It also entails applying data patterns toward effective decision-making. It can be valuable in areas rich with recorded information; analytics relies on the simultaneous application of statistics, computer programming, and operations research to quantify performance.

Organizations may apply analytics to business data to describe, predict, and improve business performance. Specifically, areas within analytics include descriptive analytics, diagnostic analytics, predictive analytics, prescriptive analytics, and cognitive analytics. Analytics may apply to a variety of fields such as marketing, management, finance, online systems, information security, and software services. Since analytics can require extensive computation (see big data), the algorithms and software used for analytics harness the most current methods in computer science, statistics, and mathematics. According to International Data Corporation, global spending on big data and business analytics (BDA) solutions is estimated to reach $215.7 billion in 2021. As per Gartner, the overall analytic platforms software market grew by $25.5 billion in 2020.

Analytics vs analysis 
Data analysis focuses on the process of examining past data through business understanding, data understanding, data preparation, modeling and evaluation, and deployment. It is a subset of data analytics, which takes multiple data analysis processes to focus on why an event happened and what may happen in the future based on the previous data. Data analytics is used to formulate larger organization decisions. 

Data analytics is a multidisciplinary field. There is extensive use of computer skills, mathematics, statistics, the use of descriptive techniques and predictive models to gain valuable knowledge from data through analytics. There is increasing use of the term advanced analytics, typically used to describe the technical aspects of analytics, especially in the emerging fields such as the use of machine learning techniques like neural networks, decision trees, logistic regression, linear to multiple regression analysis, and classification to do predictive modeling. It also includes unsupervised machine learning techniques like cluster analysis, Principal Component Analysis, segmentation profile analysis and association analysis.

Applications

Marketing optimization 
Marketing organizations use analytics to determine the outcomes of campaigns or efforts, and to guide decisions for investment and consumer targeting. Demographic studies, customer segmentation, conjoint analysis and other techniques allow marketers to use large amounts of consumer purchase, survey and panel data to understand and communicate marketing strategy.

Marketing analytics consists of both qualitative and quantitative, structured and unstructured data used to drive strategic decisions about brand and revenue outcomes. The process involves predictive modelling, marketing experimentation, automation and real-time sales communications. The data enables companies to make predictions and alter strategic execution to maximize performance results.

Web analytics allows marketers to collect session-level information about interactions on a website using an operation called sessionization. Google Analytics is an example of a popular free analytics tool that marketers use for this purpose. Those interactions provide web analytics information systems with the information necessary to track the referrer, search keywords, identify the IP address, and track activities of the visitor. With this information, a marketer can improve marketing campaigns, website creative content, and information architecture.

Analysis techniques frequently used in marketing include marketing mix modeling, pricing and promotion analyses, sales force optimization and customer analytics e.g.: segmentation. Web analytics and optimization of websites and online campaigns now frequently work hand in hand with the more traditional marketing analysis techniques. A focus on digital media has slightly changed the vocabulary so that marketing mix modeling is commonly referred to as attribution modeling in the digital or marketing mix modeling context.

These tools and techniques support both strategic marketing decisions (such as how much overall to spend on marketing, how to allocate budgets across a portfolio of brands and the marketing mix) and more tactical campaign support, in terms of targeting the best potential customer with the optimal message in the most cost-effective medium at the ideal time.

People analytics 
People analytics uses behavioral data to understand how people work and change how companies are managed.

People analytics is also known as workforce analytics, HR analytics, talent analytics, people insights, talent insights, colleague insights, human capital analytics, and HRIS analytics. HR analytics is the application of analytics to help companies manage human resources. Additionally, HR analytics has become a strategic tool in analyzing and forecasting Human related trends in the changing labor markets, using Career Analytics tools. The aim is to discern which employees to hire, which to reward or promote, what responsibilities to assign, and similar human resource problems.
For example, inspection of the strategic phenomenon of employee turnover utilizing People Analytics Tools may serve as an important analysis at times of disruption.  
 
It has been suggested that People Analytics is a separate discipline to HR analytics, representing a greater focus on business issues rather than administrative processes, and that People Analytics may not really belong within Human Resources in organizations. However, experts disagree on this, with many arguing that Human Resources will need to develop People Analytics as a key part of a more capable and strategic business function in the changing world of work brought on by automation. Instead of moving People Analytics outside HR, some experts argue that it belongs in HR, albeit enabled by a new breed of HR professional who is more data-driven and business savvy.

Portfolio analytics 
A common application of business analytics is portfolio analysis. In this, a bank or lending agency has a collection of accounts of varying value and risk. The accounts may differ by the social status (wealthy, middle-class, poor, etc.) of the holder, the geographical location, its net value, and many other factors. The lender must balance the return on the loan with the risk of default for each loan. The question is then how to evaluate the portfolio as a whole.

The least risk loan may be to the very wealthy, but there are a very limited number of wealthy people. On the other hand, there are many poor that can be lent to, but at greater risk. Some balance must be struck that maximizes return and minimizes risk. The analytics solution may combine time series analysis with many other issues in order to make decisions on when to lend money to these different borrower segments, or decisions on the interest rate charged to members of a portfolio segment to cover any losses among members in that segment.

Risk analytics 
Predictive models in the banking industry are developed to bring certainty across the risk scores for individual customers. Credit scores are built to predict an individual's delinquency behavior and are widely used to evaluate the credit worthiness of each applicant. Furthermore, risk analyses are carried out in the scientific world and the insurance industry. It is also extensively used in financial institutions like online payment gateway companies to analyse if a transaction was genuine or fraud. For this purpose, they use the transaction history of the customer. This is more commonly used in Credit Card purchases, when there is a sudden spike in the customer transaction volume the customer gets a call of confirmation if the transaction was initiated by him/her. This helps in reducing loss due to such circumstances.

Digital analytics 
Digital analytics is a set of business and technical activities that define, create, collect, verify or transform digital data into reporting, research, analyses, recommendations, optimizations, predictions, and automation. This also includes the SEO (search engine optimization) where the keyword search is tracked and that data is used for marketing purposes. Even banner ads and clicks come under digital analytics. A growing number of brands and marketing firms rely on digital analytics for their digital marketing assignments, where MROI (Marketing Return on Investment) is an important key performance indicator (KPI).

Security analytics 
Security analytics refers to information technology (IT) to gather security events to understand and analyze events that pose the greatest risk. Products in this area include security information and event management and user behavior analytics.

Software analytics 

Software analytics is the process of collecting information about the way a piece of software is used and produced.

Challenges 
In the industry of commercial analytics software, an emphasis has emerged on solving the challenges of analyzing massive, complex data sets, often when such data is in a constant state of change. Such data sets are commonly referred to as big data. Whereas once the problems posed by big data were only found in the scientific community, today big data is a problem for many businesses that operate transactional systems online and, as a result, amass large volumes of data quickly.

The analysis of unstructured data types is another challenge getting attention in the industry. Unstructured data differs from structured data in that its format varies widely and cannot be stored in traditional relational databases without significant effort at data transformation. Sources of unstructured data, such as email, the contents of word processor documents, PDFs, geospatial data, etc., are rapidly becoming a relevant source of business intelligence for businesses, governments and universities. For example, in Britain the discovery that one company was illegally selling fraudulent doctor's notes in order to assist people in defrauding employers and insurance companies is an opportunity for insurance firms to increase the vigilance of their unstructured data analysis.

These challenges are the current inspiration for much of the innovation in modern analytics information systems, giving birth to relatively new machine analysis concepts such as complex event processing, full text search and analysis, and even new ideas in presentation. One such innovation is the introduction of grid-like architecture in machine analysis, allowing increases in the speed of massively parallel processing by distributing the workload to many computers all with equal access to the complete data set.

Analytics is increasingly used in education, particularly at the district and government office levels. However, the complexity of student performance measures presents challenges when educators try to understand and use analytics to discern patterns in student performance, predict graduation likelihood, improve chances of student success, etc. For example, in a study involving districts known for strong data use, 48% of teachers had difficulty posing questions prompted by data, 36% did not comprehend given data, and 52% incorrectly interpreted data. To combat this, some analytics tools for educators adhere to an over-the-counter data format (embedding labels, supplemental documentation, and a help system, and making key package/display and content decisions) to improve educators' understanding and use of the analytics being displayed.

Risks 
Risks for the general population include discrimination on the basis of characteristics such as gender, skin colour, ethnic origin or political opinions, through mechanisms such as price discrimination or statistical discrimination.

See also

References

External links 
 

 
Financial data analysis
Formal sciences
Business intelligence terms
Big data